Shackleton is a small town in the Wheatbelt region of Western Australia.

The town is located close to the Salt River and along the disused railway line between Bruce Rock and Quairading.

The 2016 population was 96.

Originally a railway siding for the railway line when constructed in 1913, the town was developed privately before being gazetted in 1951.
The town is named after the Antarctic explorer Ernest Shackleton.

The local Agricultural Hall was officially opened in 1920 by Mr. H. Griffiths MLA; it was built on land provided by Dr. Germyn.

The Bankwest branch in the town claimed to be the world's smallest bank. The building measures , but was closed in 1997.

The surrounding areas produce wheat and other cereal crops. The town is a receival site for Cooperative Bulk Handling.

The town had an Australian rules football team from 1925 to 1970 before it disbanded.

References

External links

Grain receival points of Western Australia
Shire of Bruce Rock